Jeremy Bascom (born 1981) is a Guyanese sprinter. At the 2012 Summer Olympics, he competed in the Men's 100 metres, where he equaled the Guyanese national record in the distance.

Born in Linden, Guyana, he has lived in the United States of America since 1997, where he attended Long Island University. He also represented Guyana at the 2010 Commonwealth Games in New Delhi, India and the 2014 Commonwealth Games in Glasgow, United Kingdom.

Personal bests
100 m: 10.19 s (wind: +0.0 m/s) –  Omaha, Nebraska, 6 July 2012
200 m: 21.74 s (wind: +1.0 m/s) –  Emmitsburg, Maryland, 7 May 2005

Achievements

References

External links

Sports reference biography
Tilastopaja biography

Guyanese male sprinters
1983 births
Living people
Olympic athletes of Guyana
Athletes (track and field) at the 2012 Summer Olympics
Athletes (track and field) at the 2010 Commonwealth Games
Athletes (track and field) at the 2014 Commonwealth Games
Commonwealth Games competitors for Guyana
Competitors at the 2014 Central American and Caribbean Games
People from Linden, Guyana